Benjamin Yeung is a Hong Kong-born Canadian businessman.

Career
Yeung is one of Western Canada's most powerful real estate developers.
His real estate enterprise is well known for constructing the Living Shangri-La hotel and the Fairmont Pacific Rim hotel. He has completed over $800 million worth of projects to date.

Prior to entering the real estate sector, Yeung was a dentist by profession.

Religion
Yeung is a devout Buddhist.

Footnotes

Living people
Canadian Buddhists
Canadian chief executives
Canadian dentists
Canadian real estate businesspeople
Hong Kong chief executives
Hong Kong dentists
Hong Kong emigrants to Canada
Hong Kong real estate businesspeople
Naturalized citizens of Canada
Year of birth missing (living people)